is a railway station in Yamaguchi, Yamaguchi Prefecture, Japan.

Lines
The station is served by the Yamaguchi Line.

Station layout
The station consists of a side platform serving a single track. The sole entrance is located at the west end of the platform. A sheltered waiting area is located there as well, along with toilets and an automated ticket machine. The station is unattended.

Adjacent stations

History
The station opened on 1 October 1935.

External links
 Official website 

Railway stations in Yamaguchi Prefecture
Railway stations in Japan opened in 1935